The Tapiche River is a river in Peru.

References

Rivers of Peru
Tributaries of the Ucayali River